Born American (Finnish: Jäätävä polte; also known as Arctic Heat) is a 1986 Finnish film directed by Renny Harlin. It was originally supposed to star Chuck Norris but he backed out when filming was delayed by funding problems and his son, Mike Norris, landed the lead instead. A Finnish production, this was at that time the most expensive film ever to have been made in Finland. The Finnish Board of Film Classification initially banned the movie due to its excessive violence and anti-Soviet elements. Because of that, the movie had to be shortened 3.5 minutes before it was finally accepted for distribution October 29, 1986 with the Supreme Court decision. The premiere was December 19, 1986. The success of the film in the United States allowed Harlin to get his foot in the door in Hollywood, giving him his first American directorial work in the 1987 horror film Prison.

In his 2008  book Kohti sinipunaa, Juhani Suomi revealed that the request to ban the movie originated from Vladimir Sobolev, the Soviet Union's ambassador to Finland.

Cast
 Mike Norris as Savoy Brown
 Steve Durham as Mitch Sheppard 
 David Coburn as K.C.
 Piita Vuosalmi as Nadja Kulakova
 Vesa Vierikko as Kapsky
 Thalmus Rasulala as Admiral
 Albert Salmi as US Ambassador Drane
 Ismo Kallio as Zarkov
 Marjo Vuollo as Tamara
 Laura Munsterhjelm as Irina
 Antti Horko as Cossack
 Pauli Virtanen as Sergei
 Jone Takamaki as Interrogator
 Inkeri Luoma-Aho as Female Guard
 Markku Blomqvist as Irina's Father
 Sari Havas as Girl At Party
 Rapa Ripa as KGB Agent (uncredited)
 Mats Helge Olsson as Priest (uncredited)
 Stack Pierce as Admiral (voice) (uncredited)
 Renny Harlin as Man's Voice From Ship's Loudspeaker (voice) (uncredited)

North America box office
Born American was released in North America over the Labor Day Weekend in 1986. It was the ninth biggest movie that weekend, earning $2.2 million in 1,071 theaters. The film's overall box office take was $3,388,020.

References

External links

Fedorov, Alexander. The Analysis of Stereotypes of Politically Engaged Media Texts in Media Studies in Student Audience (by the Example of Renny Harlin’s films “Born American” (1986) and “Five Days of War” (2011)

1986 films
1986 action films
English-language Finnish films
1980s English-language films
Cold War films
Films directed by Renny Harlin
Films set in the Soviet Union
Films shot in Finland
1986 directorial debut films
Finnish action films